Paul Wilson is an Australian meditation teacher, columnist, and author of two novels and 19 self-help and spiritually-oriented books, including The Calm Technique, Instant Calm, The Little Book of Calm, Calm at Work, The Little Book of Calm at Work, Calm for Life, The Complete Book of Calm, Perfect Balance, The Quiet, A Piece of the Quiet and "Calm, No Matter What" – mostly around the topic of finding peace of mind in everyday life. Because so many of these books had 'calm' in the title, the Times (UK) nicknamed him The Guru of Calm.

It has been estimated that he has taught over a million people to meditate, and he was listed as one of the 100 people who make Britain a happier place.

Books

Calm, No Matter What 
Calm No Matter What ( was published by Pan MacMillan.

The Calm Technique 
Wilson's book The Calm Technique was one of the first mass-market books on meditation. First published in the Eighties by Greenhouse in Australia and Bantam in the USA, it attracted a wide audience in Europe, USA and South East Asia. It has been translated into several languages.

The Quiet 
The Quiet was published by Pan MacMillan in the UK and Australia and by Tarcher/Penguin in the USA.

The Little Book of Calm 
The Little Book of Calm was published by Penguin Books in 1997. It distills Wilson's larger books Instant Calm, and was written during a Zen seminar in Japan. One review described it as "the first and still one of the best books aimed at counteracting stress". The book has been translated into 24 languages including Italian, French, and Mandarin Chinese.

Wilson followed up the book with titles including The Little Book of Calm at Work in 1998, The Little Book of Sleep and The Little Book of Hope in 1999, The Life Priorities Calculator in 2000, and A Piece of the Quiet in 2007.

References in popular culture 
The Little Book of Calm featured in numerous satires and parodies in the late 1990s, with cartoons regularly appearing in UK daily newspapers.  The book was featured in the first episode of the British comedy Black Books, when Manny Bianco accidentally swallowed a copy of it.  The book is later absorbed into his body, and he is able to dole out helpful calm-inviting comments to passersby, such as "When you're feeling under pressure, do something different. Roll up your sleeves, or eat an orange".

Footnotes

Living people
Australian spiritual writers
Australian self-help writers
Year of birth missing (living people)